Frozen is a 2010 Hong Kong film directed by Derek Kwok Chi-Kin and starring Aarif Lee, Janice Man and Janice Vidal.

The story utilizes various songs and themes that are related to Hong Kong singer Leslie Cheung.

Plot
The film tells the story of Gigi and Kit who meet in high school and fall in love against her father's wishes. They elope when Gigi discovers she is pregnant with their child. However, their lives change when Gigi gets into a car accident and gives birth to their daughter.

Cast
 Janice Man as Gigi - Wing's mother and Kit's girlfriend who is comatose for 20 years following the accident on the day her daughter was born.
 Janice Vidal as Wing - daughter of Gigi and Kit. Raised by her grandfather after her mother fell into a coma.
 Aarif Rahman (younger) /  Leon Lai (older) as Kit - boyfriend of  Gigi and Wing's father who falls in love with Gigi and impregnates her with his child.
Wilfred Lau - Leslie
Alfred Cheung
Pou-Soi Cheang
Vincent Kok
Lung Ti
Yam Yam Siu

External links
 

2010 films
2010s Cantonese-language films
Hong Kong romance films
2010s romantic fantasy films
2010s teen romance films
Films directed by Derek Kwok
2010s Hong Kong films